Cladonia cervicornis is a species of cup lichen in the family Cladoniaceae. It was first described by Swedish lichenologist Erik Acharius in 1799 as Lichen cervicornis. Julius von Flotow transferred it to the genus Cladonia in 1849. In North America, it is colloquially known as the ladder lichen or elk's-horn cup lichen.

See also
 List of Cladonia species

References

cervicornis
Lichen species
Lichens described in 1799
Lichens of North America
Taxa named by Erik Acharius